Marc Stephan Jongen (born 23 May 1968) is a German politician (AfD). From 2003 to 2017 he was a research assistant for philosophy at the Staatliche Hochschule für Gestaltung Karlsruhe.

Jongen is regarded as a "party philosopher" of the right-wing AfD, having been called "chief ideologue" or "thought leader". He was the chairman of AfD Baden-Württemberg from March 2017 to February 2019 and has been its Deputy State leader ever since. In the 2017 federal election he got elected to the Bundestag.

Biography

Origins 
Jongen grew up in Lana, South Tyrol. He had Dutch nationality through his father and the Italian one through his mother.

Education 
He studied economics from 1987 to 1988 at the University of Vienna. Subsequently and until 1995, he studied philosophy, indology, German history, and philosophy of science. After three months in India, he writes a master's thesis in 1996 entitled The essence of spiritual knowledge from the Advaita Vedanta Shri Shakaracharyas, which was published by Eugen Diederichs in 1998.

Between 1996 and 1999, he wrote for the Neue Südtiroler Tageszeitung in Bolzano, and worked on a "Philosophy of Astrology". In 1999, he started a PhD at the State University for Design (HfG) of Karlsruhe under Peter Sloterdijk, supported by the  foundation. From 2001 to 2003, he was supported by the state of Baden-Württemberg. In 2009, he obtained his PhD in philosophy and in 2011, received German citizenship.

Ideology
Stuttgarter Zeitung noted that Jongen has failed to adequately distance himself from the far-right Flügel faction of the party, led by Björn Höcke. Jongen also said that there are "differences in mentality between East and West Germany".

References

External links
 Jongen's website

1968 births
German general practitioners
Living people
Members of the Bundestag 2021–2025
Members of the Bundestag 2017–2021
Members of the Bundestag for Baden-Württemberg
Members of the Bundestag for the Alternative for Germany